The Eddie "Lockjaw" Davis Cookbook is an album by saxophonist Eddie "Lockjaw" Davis with organist Shirley Scott and flautist Jerome Richardson recorded in 1958 for the Prestige label. The album was later issued as Vol. 1 when two subsequent "Cookbook" volumes were released.

Reception
The Allmusic review stated: "The music on this 1958 date holds few surprises; it's meat and potatoes all the way, but it's made using the choicest ingredients".

Track listing 
All compositions by Eddie "Lockjaw" Davis except as indicated
 "Have Horn, Will Blow" - 5:11     
 "The Chef" - 5:59     
 "But Beautiful" (Jimmy Van Heusen, Johnny Burke) - 7:40     
 "In the Kitchen" (Johnny Hodges) - 12:53     
 "Three Deuces" - 4:58     
 "Avalon" (Buddy DeSylva, Al Jolson, Vincent Rose) - 3:32 Bonus track on CD reissue

Personnel 
 Eddie "Lockjaw" Davis - tenor saxophone
 Shirley Scott - organ
 Jerome Richardson - flute (tracks 1-4), tenor saxophone (track 5)
 George Duvivier - bass
 Arthur Edgehill - drums

References 

Eddie "Lockjaw" Davis albums
1958 albums
Albums produced by Esmond Edwards
Albums recorded at Van Gelder Studio
Prestige Records albums
Shirley Scott albums